Kirp  was a newspaper published in Estonia as an inset in Sirp.

References

Defunct newspapers published in Estonia
Newspapers published in Estonia